Sardana is a given name and surname. It may refer to the following people:
Given name
Sardana Oyunskaya (1934–2007), Yakut folklorist, literary critic, and philologist
Sardana Avksentyeva (born 1970), Russian politician of Yakut ethnicity, mayor of Yakutsk (2018–21)

Surname
Khatris from Punjab carry the surname in India:
Archana Sardana (born c. 1974), Indian BASE jumper
Rohit Sardana, Indian journalist, editor, columnist, anchor and media personality 
Sharat Sardana (1968–2009), British comedy writer, voice artist and producer 

Indian surnames
Punjabi-language surnames
Surnames of Indian origin
Hindu surnames
Khatri clans
Khatri surnames